Minthostachys is a genus of the mint family Lamiaceae, comprising aromatic scandent shrubs. It occurs along the Andes from Northern Venezuela through Colombia, Ecuador, Peru and Bolivia to Central Argentina.

Use and conservation
The plants are valued by the local population for their content in essential oils, mostly pulegone and menthone, but also limonene, carvone, carvacrol, thymol and similar substances. They are used as condiments, medicinally against illnesses of the respiratory and digestive systems, and traditionally for the protection of stored tubers against pests, especially in Southern Peru. In Argentina and Peru, the essential oils are extracted commercially on a larger scale, and at least locally, this has led to overexploitation in recent years. Argentine researchers are looking for ways to protect Minthostachys or to take it into cultivation to meet increasing demand.

Important species and common names
The best known species are Minthostachys mollis distributed from Venezuela to Bolivia and Minthostachys verticillata of Argentina. Many species have a relatively restricted distribution but are locally common, like Minthostachys acutifolia around La Paz and Minthostachys ovata in central Bolivia. The common names used by the people of the Andes usually do not differentiate between species, but vary by region. In Ecuador, the genus is called tipo or poleo, in northern Peru chancua, from central Peru to Bolivia muña, and in Argentina peperina is the most frequently used name.

Species
Currently recognized species
 Minthostachys acris Schmidt-Leb. - Peru
 Minthostachys acutifolia Epling - Bolivia
 Minthostachys andina (Britton ex Rusby) Epling - La Paz region of Bolivia
 Minthostachys diffusa Epling - La Paz region of Bolivia
 Minthostachys dimorpha Schmidt-Leb. - Peru
 Minthostachys elongata Schmidt-Leb. - Tarija region of Bolivia
 Minthostachys fusca Schmidt-Leb. - La Paz region of Bolivia
 Minthostachys glabrescens (Benth.) Epling - Ecuador
 Minthostachys latifolia Schmidt-Leb. - Peru, Bolivia
 Minthostachys mollis (Benth.) Griseb. - Venezuela, Colombia, Ecuador, Peru
 Minthostachys ovata (Briq.) Epling - Bolivia
 Minthostachys rubra Schmidt-Leb. - Ecuador
 Minthostachys salicifolia Epling - Peru
 Minthostachys septentrionalis Schmidt-Leb. - Venezuela, Colombia
 Minthostachys setosa (Briq.) Epling - Bolivia
 Minthostachys spicata (Benth.) Epling - Ecuador, Peru
 Minthostachys verticillata (Griseb.) Epling - Argentina

References

Lamiaceae
Lamiaceae genera
Flora of South America